Chah Zilan (also Romanized as Chāh Zīlān; also known as Cheh Zīlān) is a village in Taftan-e Jonubi Rural District, Nukabad District, Khash County, Sistan and Baluchestan Province, Iran. At the 2006 census, its population was 24, in five families.

References 

Populated places in Khash County